Tank controls are a control system used in video games whereby players control movement relative to the position of the player character, rather than the perspective of the game camera.

Mechanism 
In a game with tank controls, pressing up (for example on a D-pad, analog stick, or cursor movement keys) on the game controller moves the character in the direction they face, down reverses them, and left and right rotates them. This differs from many 3D games, in which characters move in the direction players push from the perspective of the camera. The term "tank controls" comes from the steering mechanisms of old tanks, which had to stop completely before turning. Tank controls were common in 3D games in the 1990s, such as Grim Fandango and the early Resident Evil and Tomb Raider games.

Tank controls allow players to maintain a direction when the camera angle changes. Grim Fandango designer Tim Schafer chose the system as it allowed the developers to create "cinematic" camera cuts without disrupting the controls. Shinji Mikami, director of the first Resident Evil (1996), felt the use of fixed camera perspectives and tank controls made the game scarier.

Criticism 
Tank controls have received criticism for feeling stiff or cumbersome. They have become less common over time and free-roaming cameras have become standard for 3D games. The remastered versions of Grim Fandango and Resident Evil include alternative control schemes, and later Resident Evil games discarded tank controls.

References 

Video game terminology
Video game control methods